Craig Hogan is a Professor of Astronomy and Physics at the University of Chicago and he is the director of the Fermilab Center for Particle Astrophysics.

He is known for his theory of "holographic noise", which holds that holographic principle may imply quantum fluctuations in spatial position that would lead to apparent background noise or holographic noise measurable at gravitational wave detectors, in particular GEO 600.

He attended Palos Verdes High School.  Hogan earned in 1976 his B.A. in astronomy, with highest honors, from Harvard University, and his Ph.D. in astronomy from King's College at the University of Cambridge, England in 1980.

He was an Enrico Fermi Fellow at the University of Chicago from 1980 to 1981, a National Science Foundation Postdoctoral Fellow at Cambridge the years 1981 to 1982 and a Bantrell Prize Fellow in Theoretical Astrophysics at the California Institute of Technology from 1982 to 1985.

He was a member of the international High-z Supernova Search Team which co-discovered dark energy in 1998.

He won the Alexander von Humboldt Research Award and an Alfred P. Sloan Foundation Fellowship. He is the author of The Little Book of the Big Bang published in 1998 by Springer-Verlag, which was translated into six languages.

Awards
 2007: Gruber Prize in Cosmology (co-recipient with High-z Supernova Search Team)
 2015: Breakthrough Prize in Fundamental Physics, shared with Brian P. Schmidt, Adam Riess, and the High-Z Supernova Search Team.

Also, the 2011 Nobel Prize in Physics was awarded to Hogan's colleagues Brian P. Schmidt and Adam Riess, from the High-z Supernova Search Team for the work done by that collaboration.

External links
 Craig Hogan
 Craig Hogan, director, Center for Particle Astrophysics, Fermi National Accelerator Laboratory and professor of astronomy and astrophysics, University of Chicago, Illinois, Virginia Gewin, Nature

21st-century American physicists
Harvard University alumni
Living people
American astrophysicists
People associated with Fermilab
Alumni of King's College, Cambridge
Sloan Research Fellows
Year of birth missing (living people)